Cansdale's swamp rat (Malacomys cansdalei) is a species of rodent in the family Muridae.
It is found in Ivory Coast, Ghana, and possibly Liberia.
Its natural habitat is subtropical or tropical moist lowland forests.

References

Sources

Malacomys
Mammals described in 1958
Taxonomy articles created by Polbot